Oslo is an American television drama film about the secret negotiation of the Oslo Accords. The film was directed by Bartlett Sher and written by J. T. Rogers, based on Rogers' play of the same name. It stars Andrew Scott, Ruth Wilson, and Jeff Wilbusch. It was released on May 29, 2021, on HBO.

Plot
In December 1992, Mona Juul at the Norwegian Ministry of Foreign Affairs calls her husband Terje Rød-Larsen. Rød-Larsen, who is in Jerusalem, goes to talk to Yossi Beilin. Beilin explains to Terje that the peace talks are in a dead end, because everybody demands everything at once, and Terje offers a new approach. An Israeli meeting a Palestinian on neutral ground.

Mona Juul has a meeting with Ahmed Qurei, the minister of finance of the PLO, in London, where Mona and Terje introduce him to Yair Hirschfeld, an Israeli professor for economics. The secret meeting, since Israeli officials were not allowed to talk to Palestinians, starts cold but warms up and they agree to meet again.

The followup meeting is held in a manor near Oslo, with Qurei and Hassan Asfour as representatives of the Palestinian government and Hirschfeld and Ron Pundak as Israelis representatives. The meeting starts formal and cold, but warms up over time and through socializing and smaller hiccups results in a first series of drafts for a Declaration of Principles (DOP).

As neither Hirschfeld nor Pundak are Israeli officials, talks are about to come to an end there. After some back and forth and Terje making unfounded claims that he would get an Israeli official to join the talks, Mona decides to break the secret to Johan Jørgen Holst, the Norwegian minister of foreign affairs, who facilitates a meeting with Uri Savir from the Israeli foreign ministry to review the DOP.

This meeting starts very aggressive with Savir and Qurei accusing each other of terrorism and murder, but again warms up over time with Savir expressing willingness to give up the Gaza Strip and Jericho―a city 20 miles outside of Jerusalem―to the Palestinians as an autonomous region.

Uri Savir then presents the result to Joel Singer, the legal adviser of the Israeli Ministry of Foreign Affairs, who meets with the group to finalize the document with official backing. Instead of finalizing the document, it almost leads to a breakup of the talks over Singer's attempts to rewrite the document. At the request of Hirschfeld, Mona finally breaks her "facilitate only" doctrine and gets involved. She can defuse the situation by sharing her own story about the conflict, which was hinted by flashbacks throughout the movie.

After that the Oslo Accord is meant to be finalized through a telephone conference between Shimon Peres and Yasser Arafat. After some trouble getting Arafat, who is residing in exile in Tunis, on the line, they manage to talk to Qurei, who speaks on behalf of Arafat and the rest of the government because he claims to be more proficient in English. After a long conference, they agree to accept each other's legitimacy and postpone the controversial question on Jerusalem, thereby finalizing the negotiation.

The movie ends with a montage of archival footage of the events after the Oslo agreement, such as Yitzhak Rabin saying "We who have fought against you, the Palestinians, we say to you today, in a loud and clear voice: 'enough of blood and tears, enough'" at the White House in September 1993. It also references Rabin's assassination in 1995 and that the status of Jerusalem remained a sticking point, as well as the Second Intifada starting in September 2000. Nonetheless, it still affirms the importance of the Oslo meeting and the dialogue to facilitate a chance for peace.

Cast
 Ruth Wilson as Mona Juul, a diplomat in the Norwegian Ministry of Foreign Affairs
 Andrew Scott as Terje Rød-Larsen, Mona's husband and the director of the Fafo Foundation
 Itzik Cohen as Yossi Beilin, Deputy Foreign Minister of the State of Israel
 Salim Daw as Ahmed Qurei, Minister of Finance of the PLO
 Sasson Gabai as Shimon Peres, Foreign Minister of the State of Israel (credited as Sasson Gabay)
 Dov Glickman as Yair Hirschfeld, a professor of economics at the University of Haifa
 Rotem Keinan as Ron Pundak, Hirschfield’s associate and fellow Israeli professor
 Jeff Wilbusch as Uri Savir, the Director General of the Israeli Ministry of Foreign Affairs
 Igal Naor as Joel Singer, legal adviser of the Israeli Ministry of Foreign Affairs
 Waleed Zuaiter as Hassan Asfour, Qurei's associate and PLO liaison
 Tobias Zilliacus as Jan Egeland, State Secretary at the Norwegian Ministry of Foreign Affairs
 Karel Dobrý as Johan Jørgen Holst, Norwegian Minister of Foreign Affairs

Production
In April 2017, it was reported that the play Oslo would be brought to the screen by producer Marc Platt. It would be adapted for the screen by the playwright J. T. Rogers and directed by Bartlett Sher, the director of the Broadway production. In November 2020, it was reported Oslo had begun production in Prague. The film aired on HBO and stars Andrew Scott and Ruth Wilson.

Reception
On review aggregator Rotten Tomatoes, the film holds a 75% approval rating based on 24 reviews, with an average rating of 6.1/10. The site's critical consensus reads, "Oslo sometimes struggles to smoothly transition from the stage to screen, but Ruth Wilson and Andrew Scott bring an engaging verve to this historical snapshot of high-stakes diplomacy." On Metacritic, the film holds a rating of 54 out of 100, based on 6 critics, indicating "mixed or average reviews".

Accolades

See also
 Palestine Liberation Organization#Tunis

References

External links
 
 
 
 

2021 television films
2021 films
2021 drama films
HBO Films films
American films based on actual events
American films based on plays
Bold Films films
Drama films based on actual events
American drama television films
DreamWorks Pictures films
Films scored by Jeff Russo
Films set in the 1990s
Films shot in Prague
Films set in Oslo
Television films based on actual events
Israeli–Palestinian conflict films
2020s American films